Sri Dharmendrarama Purana Raja Maha Vihara (also known as Mayadunna Pansala) is an ancient Buddhist temple in Mayadunna, Sri Lanka. The temple is located in the Gonagolla village on Ampara – Maha Oya road approximately  distance from Uhana town. The temple has been formally recognised by the Government as an archaeological site in Sri Lanka. The designation was declared on 10 October 2014 under the government Gazette number 1884.

The temple

The temple in Mayadunna has been constructed on a natural rock plateau is belonged to the Uhana DS. Most buildings stand today at the temple are recent constructions but some of the ancient structures such as slabs of Buddha footprint, pieces of Sandakada pahana, bases of buildings and pillars still can be found within the premises. Before the construction of Buddha statues, people used various objects such as Asanaghara and Sri Pathul Gal (Buddha footprint) to represent Buddha. Therefore the presence of Sri Pathul Gal or Asanaghara in a temple is considered by the archaeology as an indicator that the temple was there before the Buddha statues were built in the country. Also a rock inscription, engraved on the rock plateau between the image house and the pond has been protected by the archaeological department.

References

External links

 

Buddhist temples in Ampara District
Archaeological protected monuments in Ampara District
Sri Lanka inscriptions